Barnaderg is a village southeast of Tuam in eastern County Galway, Ireland.

Barnaderg Castle was a 16th-century stronghold of the O'Kelly clan.

In June 2008, a €1.5m extension was opened at Barnaderg National School, which has 87 pupils. In addition to the development of new classrooms, library, offices and other rooms, refurbishment of the existing building were carried out.

Local people
 Thunderbolt Gibbons

References

Towns and villages in County Galway